FLT3 interacting zinc finger 1 is a protein that in humans is encoded by the FIZ1 gene.

Function

This gene encodes zinc finger protein, which interacts with a receptor tyrosine kinase involved in the regulation of hematopoietic and lymphoid cells. This gene product also interacts with a transcription factor that regulates the expression of rod-specific genes in retina. [provided by RefSeq, Jul 2008].

References

Further reading